Balázs Tóth B. (born 14 July 1986, in Szolnok) is a Hungarian football player who currently plays for Szolnoki MÁV FC.

References 
Paksi FC Official Website
HLSZ
MLSZ

1986 births
Living people
People from Szolnok
Hungarian footballers
Association football midfielders
Szolnoki MÁV FC footballers
Vasas SC players
Paksi FC players
BFC Siófok players
Nemzeti Bajnokság I players
Sportspeople from Jász-Nagykun-Szolnok County